Wolfbrigade (formerly Wolfpack) is a Swedish hardcore punk band formed in 1995 by Jocke Rydbjer, Frank Johansen, Erik Norberg, Marcus "M. Psykfall" Johansson and the vocalist Tomas Jonsson (known for being part of the local crust punk band Anti Cimex) their line-up has included members of Asta Kask, To What End?, Cosa Nostra, Obscure Infinity, and Harlequin.

History
Singer Tomas Jonsson was forced to leave the band in 1998 and was replaced by Micke. At around the same time, the band changed their name from Wolfpack to Wolfbrigade to avoid association with a Swedish neo-Nazi prison gang who shared that name. In 2002, drummer Frank left and was replaced by Dadde. The band split up in 2004 because of lack of motivation and Micke needing surgery for vocal cord problems. Four of the members started a new band, Today's Overdose.

On 7 January 2007, Wolfbrigade announced that they were reuniting. Wolfbrigade imported bassist Johan from Today's Overdose and released a comeback album, Prey to the World, in June 2007. In 2008, the group released Comalive. Wolfbrigade went on a one-year hiatus from playing live in 2011, and then regrouped for the release of Damned in 2012.

Wolfbrigade's last album The Enemy: Reality was released Fall 2019 through Southern Lord Records. They released an EP, Anti-Tank Dogs, on August 12, 2022.

Members

Current line-up
Mikael Dahl – vocals - (1999–present) (Today's Overdose, To What End?)
Jocke Rydbjer – guitar (1995–present) (Today's Overdose, ex-To What End?, ex-Obscure Infinity, ex-Sunday Morning Einsteins)
Erik Norberg – guitar (1995–present) (Today's Overdose, ex-Obscure Infinity)
Johan Erkenvåg – bass (2004–present) (Today's Overdose)
Tommy Storback – drums (2015–present) (Nifters, The Clockwork Crew, ex-Booze & Glory)

Former
David "Dadde" Stark – drums (2002-2015) (Today's Overdose, Asta Kask, To What End?, Ubba, Second Thought, Sju Svåra År, Suicide Blitz, Disculpa, ex-Fear, ex-Imperial Leather, ex-Sunday Morning Einsteins, ex-The Pipelines)
Tomas Jonsson – vocals (1995-1998) (Anti Cimex, Moment Maniacs, Shitlickers)
Frank Johansen – drums (1995-2002) (End of All, ex-Obscure Infinity)
Marcus "M. Psykfall" Johansson – bass (1995-2004) (Harlequin)

Timeline

Discography

as Wolfpack

Albums
A New Dawn Fades (1996)
Lycanthro Punk (1997)
Allday Hell (1999)

EPs and Splits
Bloodstained Dreams (1995)
Hellhound Warpig (1997)
split with Skitsystem (1998)

as Wolfbrigade

Albums
Progression/Regression (2001)
In Darkness You Feel No Regrets (2003)
Prey to the World (2007)
Comalive (2008)
Damned (2012)
Run with the Hunted (2017)
The Enemy: Reality  (2019)

EPs
Split with Audio Kollaps (2001)
A D-beat Odyssey (2004)
Anti-Tank Dogs (2022)

Compilations
The Wolfpack Years (2003)

References

External links

 Official Myspace site
 Official blog

Swedish crust and d-beat groups
Musical groups established in 1995
Swedish heavy metal musical groups